Camp Yeomalt is a one-story lodge originally built as a Boy Scout camp on Bainbridge Island, Washington. The camp was originally built as Camp Major Hopkins (named for Major Maurice Jayne Hopkins) in 1935 by unemployed island residents, recruited by the Franklin D. Roosevelt's Works Progress Administration. The original lodge was built of Douglas-fir logs, in "camp style" architecture. The western side of the lodge has a stone chimney, with fire boxes on both the interior and exterior sides. The Bainbridge Island Park & Recreation District took ownership of the camp in 1987, and renamed it Camp Yeomalt in 2000. The camp was added to the National Register of Historic Places in 2005. The term "Yeomalt" is an anglicization of a Lushootseed word ("Yeboa'lt") meaning "fight".

References

External links
 Camp Yeomalt - Bainbridge Island Parks & Recreation

Residential buildings on the National Register of Historic Places in Washington (state)
Works Progress Administration in Washington (state)
Buildings and structures in Kitsap County, Washington
Bainbridge Island, Washington
Parks in Kitsap County, Washington
National Register of Historic Places in Kitsap County, Washington
Log buildings and structures on the National Register of Historic Places in Washington (state)